The following is an episode list for the internet Star Trek fan film series known as Star Trek: New Voyages and Star Trek: Phase II.

Episodes

Unfinished
Following CBS/Paramount's new Star Trek fan film guidelines, the final three episodes of New Voyages were left in an unfinished post-production state, as several key members of the production team (including series creator James Cawley) cannot continue work on the series under the guidelines, which forbid previous contributors to official Star Trek projects from working on fan films.

Vignettes
In addition to the full-length episodes, a series of short, ten-minute-long films called "the vignettes" were filmed with the intention of being released in the months leading up to the release of "To Serve All My Days". 
The vignettes include:
 "Center Seat" ~ Written by Erik Korngold, Directed by Erik Goodrich and filmed during the production of "To Serve All My Days". This tells the story of Sulu's return from Command Training to rejoin the crew of Enterprise (where DeSalle has been "filling in" for the legendary helmsman). Released on March 17, 2006 (5 minutes 29 seconds "Original Release"; 5 minutes 46 seconds "Full Score Restored") 
 "No Win Scenario" ~ Written by Erik Korngold, Directed by Erik Goodrich. Starring John Carrigan, James Cawley, Annie Carrigan and Guest Starring Larry Nemecek and Paul Seiber. Released on October 8, 2011 (9 minutes 5 seconds) 
 "Change of Command" ~ Written by Erik Korngold, Directed by Erik Goodrich. Starring Jeff Quinn, Charles Root, James Cawley and Kurt Carley as Capt. Christopher Pike. Never released.
 "Auld Lang Syne" ~ Written by Erik Korngold and intended to be an animated vignette, the story centered on the moment, during New Year's celebrations, when Chekov is promoted. The dialogue was directed and recorded by Erik Goodrich during the filming of "To Serve All My Days". Never released.
 "No Lesson Learned" ~ Written by Erik Korngold. Never released.
 "Untitled Rand/DeSalle Story" ~ Written by Erik Korngold. Never released.

Further Vignettes have been shot and some have been released.
 "Going Boldly" released on August 6, 2012 with incomplete sound mix. (9 minutes 4 seconds) 
 "Heroes" to be filmed between October 1 and October 3, 2013
 "Music" to be filmed between October 1 and October 3, 2013

All unreleased "Classic" (pre 2010) vignettes have been shelved, due to the poor quality of the footage compared to the current high-def quality episodes now being released. Re-filming some of the vignettes has been discussed as a possibility.

References

External links
 Star Trek: New Voyages/Phase II official website
 TV.com Star Trek: New Voyages Entry
 

New Voyages episodes
New Voyages episodes
Star Trek: New Voyages episodes, List of